Air Arabia Egypt is a low-cost carrier based in Egypt. The airline is a subsidiary of Air Arabia. The head office is in Heliopolis Cairo, Egypt.

The airline secured it operating license from the Egyptian authorities on the 22 May 2010 and began commercial operations on 1 June 2010. The airline is based at Alexandria's Borg El Arab Airport.

History
Air Arabia Egypt is an Alexandria-based Air Arabia Group company. The airline offers low-cost travel to a number of destinations across the region. The company focuses on booking online. Air Arabia Egypt also provides booking facilities through call centers, travel agents, appointed GSA's and sales shops.

Operations

During the Arab Air Carriers Organization conference in October 2009, Air Arabia CEO Adel Ali indicated that the new airline would operate from Alexandria and a Red Sea station (either Sharm el-Sheikh or Hurghada) as well as Cairo. "Egypt has different needs," he says, in contrast to the single bases established by Air Arabia in Sharjah and Morocco.

Destinations
As of December 2019, the airline flies to the following destinations:

Fleet
The Air Arabia Egypt fleet consists of the following aircraft as of August 2021:

The airline's fleet will center around the Airbus A320 (as operated by Air Arabia). The airline currently operates six aircraft leased from Air Arabia.

References

Low-cost carriers
Airlines of Egypt
Airlines established in 2010
Egyptian companies established in 2010